Living Room Scene is an album by the American alternative rock band Dillon Fence, released in 1994. It was the band's final studio album; half the band left shortly after its release, forcing singer Greg Humphreys and drummer Scott Carle to support it with two new touring musicians. The title track was Living Room Scene'''s first single.

Production
The bulk of the album was recorded at Ardent Studios, in Memphis, Tennessee. It was produced by Mark Freegard. "Fayetteville", the closing instrumental track, was written by Humphreys and performed by his grandmother on her Young Chang piano.

Critical receptionTrouser Press wrote that "Humphreys exercises a raspy Rod Stewart voice (which he intimated on Outside In) and a fat ’70s Gibson SG tone on the title track, then downplays both in the cushy electric soul folds of 'Laughs' and the squalling harmony pop of 'Queen of the In-Between'." The Washington Post opined that "the band's most memorable songs tend to be its most derivative ones: 'Coffee Cup' begins with singer Greg Humphreys emulating Rod Stewart, while 'Unnoticed' bears more than a passing resemblance to the Church." The State called the album "superb," writing that Dillon Fence's music "is catchy, edgy and often Beatlesque." The Record praised the "spontaneity and looseness" of the music, stating that on "Laughs" "Humphreys' vocals and layered background harmonies float amid turbulent rhythm guitars." The Richmond Times-Dispatch'' stated: "Three-part harmonies, husky to screechy lead vocals, jangling or dense guitar tracks and propulsive drumming make for a fine pop and rock listen."

AllMusic wrote that the album "combines some absolutely stellar '90s power-pop with tasty, '70s, stud-rock guitars and a big dollop of blue-eyed soul."

Track listing

Personnel
Kent Alphin - guitar
Scott Carle - drums
Chris Goode - bass
Greg Humphreys - vocals, guitar

References

1994 albums
Mammoth Records albums